This is a list of Croatian television related events from 1981.

Events

Debuts

Television shows
 Velo misto (1980–1981)

Ending this year

Births
19 January - Jelena Perčin, actress
18 February - Marijana Batinić, TV personality
29 March - Dolores Lambaša, actress (d. 2013)
4 June - Mila Horvat, TV host
27 June - Iva Jerković, model and TV host
8 September - Ivan Vukušić, TV host
27 November - Nataša Janjić, actress
6 December - Marijana Mikulić, Bosnian-born actress

Deaths